Fabien Ourega (born 7 December 1992) is a French professional footballer who plays as a midfielder for Astana.

Professional career
Ourega began his footballing career in the lower division of France, before moving to R.E. Virton in 2015. Afterwards, he spent a year without a club. In 2018 earned a professional contract with Paris FC. Ourega made his professional debut with Paris FC in a 0–0 Ligue 2 tie with LB Châteauroux on 19 October 2018.

On 29 January 2022 Ourega signed for a Lithuanian club FK Žalgiris.

On 13 February 2023, Ourega signed for Kazakhstan Premier League club Astana.

Personal life
Born in France, Ourega is of Ivorian descent.

References

External links
 
 

1992 births
Living people
Footballers from Paris
French footballers
French sportspeople of Ivorian descent
Association football midfielders
JA Drancy players
Le Havre AC players
R.E. Virton players
Paris FC players
FC Sochaux-Montbéliard players
US Orléans players
FK Žalgiris players
Championnat National 2 players
Championnat National 3 players
Ligue 2 players
Challenger Pro League players
Championnat National players
A Lyga players
French expatriate footballers
French expatriate sportspeople in Belgium
Expatriate footballers in Belgium
French expatriate sportspeople in Lithuania
Expatriate footballers in Lithuania